The Argentine Evangelical Methodist Church, is a member of the World Council of Churches and has 8,940 members and 123 congregations. While autonomous, the denomination is affiliated with the United Methodist Church.

History 
In 1836, the Methodist Episcopal Church decided to send missionaries to Buenos Aires. Earlier Methodist bodies, resulting from the missions, merged to form the Evangelical Methodist Church in Argentina in 1969.

Social Issues 
Women are able to be ordained in the denomination. The church has "given, on a national level, freedom to each congregation to accompany...[same-sex] couples. [They] give freedom of action to be able to bless them". In an episcopal letter, Bishop Frank de Nully Brown shared that the church opposes any kind of secular or religions discrimination.

References 

Members of the World Council of Churches
Methodism in Argentina